Cerautola mittoni is a butterfly in the family Lycaenidae. It is found in Uganda and the Democratic Republic of the Congo.

Taxonomy
The species was previously treated as a synonym of Cerautola crippsi, but was raised to species status in 2013.

References

Butterflies described in 1964
Poritiinae
Butterflies of Africa